The Making of Fanny and Alexander is a 1984 Swedish documentary film directed by Ingmar Bergman which traces the making of his film Fanny and Alexander. Its running length is 110 minutes and it is photographed by Arne Carlsson. It debuted at the Swedish Film Institute on 16 September 1984, with Bergman in attendance to give a speech. It then aired with a television repeat of Fanny and Alexander in Sweden on 18 August 1986. In 2011 in Region A, The Criterion Collection released The Making of Fanny and Alexander on Blu-ray as part of their release of Fanny and Alexander.

The film was awarded as "Best documentary" at Chicago International Film Festival 1986 and the Golden Gate Award as "Best film about film" at San Francisco International Film Festival 1987.

Storyline
It is a documentary chronicle of how  Ingmar Bergman made an Oscar winning film.

Cast
Daniel Bergman as himself
Ingmar Bergman as himself
Gunnar Björnstrand as himself
Allan Edwall as himself
Ewa Fröling as herself
Lars Karlsson as himself
Erland Josephson as himself
Sven Nykvist as himself
Peter Schildt as himself

References

External links

Criterion Collection essay by Paul Arthur

1984 films
Documentary films about films
Films directed by Ingmar Bergman
Swedish documentary films
1980s Swedish-language films
1984 documentary films
Films set in Uppsala
1980s Swedish films